Ben Ainsworth (born 10 February 1998) is a professional Australian rules footballer playing for the Gold Coast Football Club in the Australian Football League (AFL). He was drafted by the Gold Coast Football Club with their first selection and fourth overall in the 2016 national draft.

Statistics
 Statistics are correct to the end of round 2, 2022

|-
|- style="background-color: #EAEAEA"
! scope="row" style="text-align:center" | 2017
|style="text-align:center;"|
| 27 || 13 || 14 || 9 || 88 || 64 || 152 || 45 || 42 || 1.1 || 0.7 || 6.8 || 4.9 || 11.7 || 3.5 || 3.2 || 0
|-
! scope="row" style="text-align:center" | 2018
|style="text-align:center;"|
| 9 || 16 || 6 || 12 || 131 || 106 || 237 || 45 || 52 || 0.4 || 0.8 || 8.2 || 6.6 || 14.8 || 2.8 || 3.3 || 0
|- style="background-color: #EAEAEA"
! scope="row" style="text-align:center" | 2019
|style="text-align:center;"|
| 9 || 12 || 8 || 6 || 110 || 90 || 200 || 49 || 19 || 0.7 || 0.5 || 9.2 || 7.5 || 16.7 || 4.1 || 1.6 || 0
|-
! scope="row" style="text-align:center" | 2020
|style="text-align:center;"|
| 9 || 16 || 12 || 13 || 147 || 80 || 227 || 70 || 27 || 0.8 || 0.8 || 9.2 || 5.0 || 14.2 || 4.4 || 1.7 || 2
|- style="background-color: #EAEAEA"
! scope="row" style="text-align:center" | 2021
|style="text-align:center;"|
| 9 || 17 || 12 || 18 || 187 || 74 || 261 || 90 || 35 || 0.7 || 1.1 || 11.0 || 4.4 || 15.4 || 5.3 || 2.1 || 0
|-
! scope="row" style="text-align:center" | 2022
|style="text-align:center;"|
| 9 || 2 || 2 || 2 || 25 || 8 || 33 || 11 || 5 || 1.0 || 1.0 || 12.5 || 4.0 || 16.5 || 5.5 || 2.5 || TBA
|-
|- class="sortbottom"
! colspan=3| Career
! 76
! 54
! 60
! 688
! 422
! 1110
! 310
! 180
! 0.7
! 0.8
! 9.1
! 5.6
! 14.6
! 4.1
! 2.4
! 2
|}

Notes

References

External links

1998 births
Living people
Gold Coast Football Club players
Gippsland Power players
Australian rules footballers from Victoria (Australia)